Maupin is a surname. Notable people with the surname include:

Armistead Maupin (born 1944), American writer
Audry Maupin (1972–1994), boyfriend of Florence Rey, involved in a 1994 shoot-out in Paris
Bennie Maupin (born 1940), American musician
Claudia Maupin (1936–2013), American murder victim
David Maupin, American gallery director and co-founder of Lehmann Maupin Gallery
Gabriel Maupin, French Huguenot to Virginia (1666–1720)
Harry Maupin (1872–1952), baseball pitcher
Keith Matthew Maupin (1983–2004),  U.S. Army soldier
Robert Lee Maupin (1918–1992), also known as Robert Beck or Iceberg Slim,   author
Simon Maupin (before 1625–1668), French architect
Jim Maupin, aircraft manufacturer in the United States